Gomel Governorate was an administrative division (a guberniya) of the Russian Soviet Federative Socialist Republic from 1919 to 1926. Its capital was Gomel. It was formed from nine uyezds of the abolished Mogilev Governorate, one uyezd of Minsk Governorate and four uyezds of Chernigov Governorate.

At its establishment, Gomel Governorate was made up of fourteen uyezds:
Bykhovsky Uyezd
Gomelsky Uyezd
Goretsky Uyezd
Klimovichsky Uyezd
Mglinsky Uyezd with Pochepsky District
Mogilyovsky Uyezd
Novozybkovsky Uyezd
Orshansky Uyezd
Rechitsky Uyezd
Rogachyovsky Uyezd
Starodubsky Uyezd
Surazhsky Uyezd
Chaussky Uyezd
Cherikovsky Uyezd

In 1920, Orshansky Uyezd was transferred to Vitebsk Governorate. In 1921, Surazhsky Uyezd was renamed Klintsovsky. In 1922, Goretsky Uyezd became a part of Smolensk Governorate. On May 4, Mglinsky and Cherikovsky Uyezds were abolished and new Pochepsky District was established. On May 5, 1923, by the order of the Presidium of the All-Russian Central Executive Committee it was transferred to Bryansk Governorate.

In 1923, Bykhovsky, Klimovichsky, and Cherikovsky Uyezds were abolished and Kalininsky Uyezd was founded.

In March 1924, Kalininsky, Mogilyovsky, and Rogachyovsky Uyezds were transferred to the territory of the Byelorussian Soviet Socialist Republic.

In December 1926, Gomel Governorate was abolished. Gomelsky and Rechitsky Uyezds were transferred to the BSSR, and Klintsovsky, Novozybkovsky, and Starodubsky Uyezds were transferred to Bryansk Governorate of the Russian Soviet Federative Socialist Republic.

References

Governorates of the Russian Soviet Federative Socialist Republic